Deep Run is a tributary of Big Pipe Creek in Carroll County, Maryland in the United States.

References

Rivers of Maryland
Rivers of Carroll County, Maryland